= 1970–71 Plunket Shield season =

Cricket tournament in New Zealand

1970–71 Plunket Shield
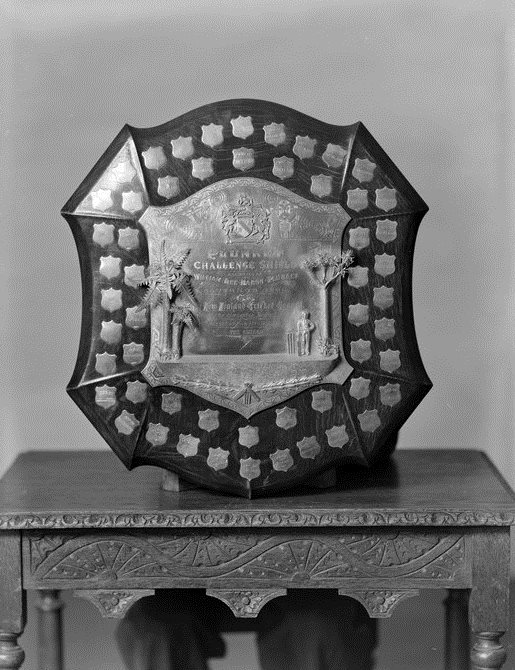
- The Plunket Shield trophy
- Cricket format: First-class
- Tournament format(s): Round-robin
- Champions: Central Districts (4th title)
- Participants: 6
- Matches: 15

The 1970–71 Plunket Shield season was a tournament of the Plunket Shield, the domestic first-class cricket competition of New Zealand.

Central Districts won the championship, finishing at the top of the points table at the end of the round-robin tournament between the six first-class sides, Auckland, Canterbury, Central Districts, Northern Districts, Otago, and Wellington. A new bonus point system was introduced, with one bonus point for every 25 runs over 150 and for every 2 wickets taken (in the first 65 overs only) with points for draws no longer being awarded.

== Table ==
Below are the Plunket Shield standings for the season:

Team	Played	Won	Lost	Drawn	Abandoned	Bonus points		Points	Net RpW
Team	Played	Won	Lost	Drawn	Abandoned	Batting	Bowling	Points	Net RpW
Central Districts	5	3	0	1	1	8	16	54	9.203
Wellington	5	2	1	2	0	12	19	51	7.363
Auckland	5	2	1	2	0	16	13	49	9.909
Canterbury	5	1	2	2	0	8	13	31	0.257
Otago	5	1	3	1	0	3	17	30	−3.135
Northern Districts	5	1	3	0	1	5	12	27	−20.597
